Rocamadour-Padirac is a railway station 4.6 km northeast of Rocamadour and 8 km west of Padirac, Occitanie, France. The station is also close to Alvignac. The station is on the Brive–Toulouse (via Capdenac) railway line. The station is served by Intercités de nuit (night train) and TER (local) services operated by SNCF.

Train services
The following services currently call at Rocamadour-Padirac:
night services (Intercités de nuit) Paris–Orléans–Figeac–Rodez–Albi
local service (TER Occitanie) Brive-la-Gaillarde–Figeac–Rodez

References

Railway stations in Lot (department)